is an English contract law case, which applied the controversial pre-existing duty rule in the context of part payments of debts. It is a leading case from the House of Lords on the legal concept of consideration. It established the rule that prevents parties from discharging an obligation by part performance, affirming Pinnel's Case (1602) 5 Co Rep 117a. In that case it was said that "payment of a lesser sum on the day [i.e., on or after the due date of a money debt] cannot be any satisfaction of the whole."

Facts
The appellant, Dr John Weston Foakes, owed the respondent, Julia Beer, a sum of £2,090 19s after a court judgment. Beer agreed that she would not take any action against Foakes for the amount owed if he would sign an agreement promising to pay an initial sum of £500 (£52,615.38 in 2012 adjusted for inflation) and pay £150 twice yearly until the whole amount was paid back. Foakes was in financial difficulty and, with the help of his solicitor, drew up an agreement for Beer to waive any interest on the amount owed. She signed. Foakes paid back the principal but not the interest. Then Beer sued Foakes for the interest. The question was whether she was entitled to it, despite their agreement that he would not need to pay it.

Judgment

Queen's Bench
At trial, the court found in favour of Foakes. Watkin Williams J upheld this decision, given the agreement between the two. Mathew J said,

Court of Appeal
On appeal, in a short judgment Brett MR instead held for Beer because there was no consideration for the agreement. Lindley LJ and Fry LJ concurred without giving considered opinions.

House of Lords
The House of Lords (Earl of Selborne LC, Lord Watson and Lord FitzGerald) upheld the ruling of the Court of Appeal in favour of Beer. They reasoned that though the agreement did not contemplate the interest owed, it could still be implied given an enforceable agreement. However, the promise to pay a debt was deemed not to be sufficient consideration as there was no additional benefit moving from Foakes to Beer that was not already owed to her.

Lord Blackburn, however, while not overtly dissenting, seemed to express reservations.

Significance
Barely more than a restatement of the ancient rule in Pinnel's case, Foakes v Beer was effectively treated as per incuriam by Lord Denning in  Central London Property Trust Ltd v High Trees House Ltd, on the basis that in 1884 the court in Foakes had failed to pay cognisance to the 1877 case of Hughes v Metropolitan Railway Co, which had introduced the concept of promissory estoppel.

See also
English contract law
 Central London Property Trust Ltd v High Trees House Ltd
D&C Builders Ltd v Rees
Williams v Roffey Bros Ltd
Re Selectmove Ltd
Collier v Wright Ltd

Notes

References
J O'Sullivan, 'In Defence of Foakes v Beer' [1996] CLJ 219

1884 in case law
1884 in British law
English enforceability case law
English consideration case law
House of Lords cases
Lord Blackburn cases